Cédric Pioline and Fabrice Santoro were the defending champions, but Pioline instead competed in the Legends Over 45 Doubles event. Santoro played alongside Sébastien Grosjean in the round robin.

Mansour Bahrami and Fabrice Santoro won the title, defeating Arnaud Clément and Nicolas Escudé in the final, 6–2, 2–6, [11–9].

Draw

Final

Group A
Standings are determined by: 1. number of wins; 2. number of matches; 3. in three-players-ties, percentage of sets won, or of games won; 4. steering-committee decision.

Group B
Standings are determined by: 1. number of wins; 2. number of matches; 3. in three-players-ties, percentage of sets won, or of games won; 4. steering-committee decision.

References
Main Draw

Legends Under 45 Doubles